The Minnesota Golden Gophers are a Division I college wrestling team based in Minneapolis, Minnesota. They are a member of the Big Ten Conference and NCAA. Wrestling began at the University of Minnesota in 1910, but the first formal dual meet was not until 1921 when coach Frank Gilman led the team to a victory over Wisconsin. The Gophers have won the NCAA Division I Wrestling Championships team title three times, in 2001, 2002, and 2007.

J Robinson served as head coach for the team for thirty years, leading the Golden Gophers to three national championships until he was fired in 2016 over his handling of a prescription drug scandal involving his wrestlers. Three-time Golden Gopher wrestling All-American Brandon Eggum was named as head coach following Robinson's departure.

Home meets
Home meets are held in the 5,700-seat Maturi Pavilion in Minneapolis. When large crowds are expected, meets are held in Williams Arena, capacity 14,321. This often happens for matches against archrivals Iowa and Oklahoma State. Several home matches each year are televised by the Big Ten Network. The school has also used Target Center in downtown Minneapolis for some matches.

Team championships
NCAA Division I: 2001, 2002, 2007
Big Ten Conference: 1910, 1912, 1913, 1941, 1957, 1959, 1999, 2001, 2002, 2003, 2006, 2007

The 2001 team has two unique distinctions: All ten wrestlers in each weight class earned All-American (top eight) status and the school won the national team championship despite not having a single finalist.

NCAA individual champions
The Gophers have had eighteen NCAA individual champions. Five of those were two-time champions.

John Whitaker: 1937
Dale Hanson: 1939 (Most Valuable Wrestler)
 Leonard Levy: 1941
Verne Gagne:  1948, 1949
Dick Mueller: 1953
Evan Johnson: 1976
Pat Neu: 1977
Marty Morgan: 1991
Tim Hartung: 1998, 1999
Brock Lesnar: 2000
Luke Becker:  2002
Jared Lawrence: 2002
Damion Hahn: 2003, 2004
Dustin Schlatter: 2006
Cole Konrad: 2006, 2007
Jayson Ness: 2010
Tony Nelson: 2012, 2013
Gable Steveson: 2021, 2022

Dan Hodge Trophy

2010 – Jayson Ness
2021 – Gable Steveson

Olympians
 Verne Gagne, 1948
 Alan Rice, 1956
 Dan Chandler, 1976, 1980, 1984
 J Evan Johnson, 1976
 Jim Martinez, Bronze medalist 1984
 Evan Bernstein, 1988 for Israel
 Brandon Paulson, Silver medalist 1996
 Gordy Morgan, 9th place 1996
 Garrett Lowney, Bronze medalist 2000
 Jacob Deitchler, 12th place Beijing 2008
 Gable Steveson, Gold medalist 2020

Notable Golden Gopher wrestlers

 Evan Bernstein – Olympian in Greco-Roman wrestling at 1988 Summer Olympics
 Dan Chandler – Olympian in Greco-Roman wrestling at 1976 and 1984 Summer Olympics
 Jake Deitchler – Olympian in Greco-Roman wrestling at 2008 Summer Olympics
 Verne Gagne – two-time NCAA Champion
 Cole Konrad – MMA fighter, first Bellator Heavyweight World Champion, two-time NCAA Champion and three-time finalist
 Nik Lentz – UFC fighter
 Brock Lesnar – UFC Heavyweight Champion, professional wrestler, NCAA Champion and two-time finalist
 Leonard Levy – National Football League player, professional wrestler, NCAA Champion
 Garrett Lowney – Olympic bronze medalist in Greco-Roman wrestling at 2000 Summer Olympics
 James Martinez – Olympic bronze medalist in Greco-Roman wrestling at 1984 Summer Olympics, NCAA All-American
 Gordy Morgan – Olympian in Greco-Roman wrestling at 1996 Summer Olympics, NCAA All-American
 Marty Morgan – NCAA Champion at Minnesota
 Brandon Paulson – Olympic silver medalist in Greco-Roman wrestling at 1996 Summer Olympics, NCAA All-American
 Alan Rice – Olympian in Greco-Roman wrestling at 1956 Summer Olympics
 Dustin Schlatter – NCAA Champion and three-time All-American
 Gable Stevenson – Olympic gold medalist in freestyle wrestling at 2020 Summer Olympics, professional wrestler, two-time NCAA Champion and three-time All-American
 Jacob Volkmann – UFC fighter, three-time NCAA All-American

References

External links
 

 
1910 establishments in Minnesota
Sports clubs established in 1910